Ooi Hock Lim (born 19 September 1943) is a Malaysian sprinter. He competed in the men's 4 × 100 metres relay at the 1968 Summer Olympics.

References

1943 births
Living people
Athletes (track and field) at the 1968 Summer Olympics
Malaysian male sprinters
Olympic athletes of Malaysia
Place of birth missing (living people)